Results from the 1990 Monaco Grand Prix Formula Three held at Monte Carlo on May 26, 1990, in the Circuit de Monaco.

Classification 

Monaco Grand Prix Formula Three
Formula Three
Motorsport in Monaco